Darbandrud Rural District is a rural district (dehestan) in the Central District of Asadabad County, Hamadan Province, Iran. At the 2006 census, its population was 13,054, in 3,073 families. The rural district has 16 villages.

References 

Rural Districts of Hamadan Province
Asadabad County